Percy Wickremasekera is Sri Lankan lawyer, politician and trade unionist. He was the General Secretary of the United Corporations and Mercantile Union and a member of the Politburo of the  LSSP.

Educated at the Royal College, Colombo and at the Colombo Law College, he became a lawyer.

A Political Bureau member of the LSSP he contest the 2004 general elections from the United People's Freedom Alliance in the Colombo District.

References

Living people
Sinhalese lawyers
Lanka Sama Samaja Party politicians
Sri Lankan trade unionists
Sri Lankan Trotskyists
Alumni of Royal College, Colombo
Year of birth missing (living people)